Microbacterium is a genus of bacteria in the family Microbacteriaceae. Microbacteria are common contaminants of laboratory reagents, which can lead to their being misrepresented in microbiome data.

Species
Microbacterium comprises the following species:

 M. aerolatum Zlamala et al. 2002
 M. agarici Young et al. 2010
 M. album Yang et al. 2018
 M. algeriense Lenchi et al. 2020

 M. amylolyticum Anand et al. 2012
 M. aoyamense Kageyama et al. 2006
 M. aquimaris Kim et al. 2008
 M. arabinogalactanolyticum (Yokota et al. 1993) Takeuchi and Hatano 1998
 M. arborescens (ex Frankland and Frankland 1889) Imai et al. 1985
 M. arthrosphaerae Kämpfer et al. 2011
 M. assamensis Kaur et al. 2011
 M. atlanticum Xie et al. 2022
 M. aurantiacum Takeuchi and Hatano 1998
 M. aureliae Kaur et al. 2016
 M. aurum Yokota et al. 1993
 M. awajiense Kageyama et al. 2008
 M. azadirachtae Madhaiyan et al. 2010
 M. barkeri (Collins et al. 1983) Takeuchi and Hatano 1998
 M. binotii Clermont et al. 2009
 M. bovistercoris Ling et al. 2019
 M. caowuchunii Tian et al. 2021
 M. chengjingii Zhou et al. 2021
 M. chocolatum Takeuchi and Hatano 1998
 M. cremeum Xie et al. 2022
 M. deminutum Kageyama et al. 2006
 M. deserti Yang et al. 2018
 M. dextranolyticum Yokota et al. 1993
 M. diaminobutyricum Fidalgo et al. 2016
 M. enclense Mawlankar et al. 2015
 M. endophyticum Alves et al. 2015
 M. esteraromaticum (Omelianski 1923) Takeuchi and Hatano 1998
 M. excoecariae Chen et al. 2020
 M. faecale Chen et al. 2016
 M. fandaimingii Zhou et al. 2021
 M. flavescens (Lochhead 1958) Takeuchi and Hatano 1998
 M. flavum Kageyama et al. 2008
 M. fluvii Kageyama et al. 2008
 M. foliorum Behrendt et al. 2001
 M. gilvum Chen et al. 2016
 M. ginsengisoli Park et al. 2008
 M. ginsengiterrae Kim et al. 2010
 M. gorillae Hadjadj et al. 2016
 M. gubbeenense Brennan et al. 2001
 M. halimionae Alves et al. 2015
 M. halophilum Takeuchi and Hatano 1998
 M. halophytorum Li et al. 2018
 M. halotolerans Li et al. 2005
 M. hatanonis Bakir et al. 2008
 M. helvum Li et al. 2021
 M. hibisci Yan et al. 2017
 M. hominis Takeuchi and Hatano 1998
 M. horti Akter et al. 2016
 M. humi Young et al. 2010
 M. hydrocarbonoxydans Schippers et al. 2005
 M. hydrothermale Zhang et al. 2014
 M. ihumii Yacouba et al. 2022
 M. immunditiarum Krishnamurthi et al. 2012
 M. imperiale (Steinhaus 1941) Collins et al. 1983
 M. indicum Shivaji et al. 2007
 M. insulae Yoon et al. 2009
 M. invictum Vaz-Moreira et al. 2009
 M. jejuense Kook et al. 2014
 M. karelineae Zhu et al. 2021
 M. keratanolyticum (Yokota et al. 1993) Takeuchi and Hatano 1998
 M. ketosireducens Takeuchi and Hatano 1998
 M. kitamiense Matsuyama et al. 1999
 M. koreense Lee et al. 2006
 M. kribbense Dastager et al. 2008
 M. kyungheense Kook et al. 2014
 M. lacticum Orla-Jensen 1919 (Approved Lists 1980)
 M. lacus Kageyama et al. 2008
 M. lacusdiani Zhang et al. 2017
 M. laevaniformans (ex Dias and Bhat 1962) Collins et al. 1983
 M. lemovicicum Mondani et al. 2013
 M. lindanitolerans Lal et al. 2010
 M. liquefaciens (Collins et al. 1983) Takeuchi and Hatano 1998
 M. lushaniae Tian et al. 2021
 M. luteolum (Yokota et al. 1993) Takeuchi and Hatano 1998
 M. luteum Xie et al. 2022
 M. luticocti Vaz-Moreira et al. 2008
 M. mangrovi Lee et al. 2014
 M. marinilacus Kageyama et al. 2007

 M. marinum Zhang et al. 2012
 M. maritypicum corrig. (ZoBell and Upham 1944) Takeuchi and Hatano 1998

 M. mitrae Kim et al. 2011
 M. murale ämpfer et al. 2012
 M. nanhaiense Yan et al. 2015
 M. natoriense Liu et al. 2005
 M. neimengense Gao et al. 2013
 M. nematophilum Hodgkin et al. 2000
 M. oleivorans Schippers et al. 2005
 M. oryzae Kumari et al. 2013
 M. otitidis Roland and Stroman 2002
 M. oxidans Ali et al. 2016
 M. oxydans (Chatelain and Second 1966) Schumann et al. 1999
 M. paludicola Park et al. 2006
 M. panaciterrae Nguyen et al. 2015
 M. paraoxydans Laffineur et al. 2003
 M. paulum Bellassi et al. 2021
 M. petrolearium Wang et al. 2014
 M. phyllosphaerae Behrendt et al. 2001
 M. populi Li et al. 2015
 M. profundi Wu et al. 2008
 M. protaetiae Heo et al. 2020
 M. proteolyticum Alves et al. 2015
 M. pseudoresistens Young et al. 2010
 M. pumilum Kageyama et al. 2006
 M. pygmaeum Kageyama et al. 2008
 M. pyrexiae Ko et al. 2007
 M. radiodurans Zhang et al. 2010
 M. resistens (Funke et al. 1998) Behrendt et al. 2001
 M. rhizomatis Hoang et al. 2015
 M. rhizosphaerae Cho and Lee 2017
 M. saccharophilum Ohta et al. 2013
 M. saperdae (Lysenko 1959) Takeuchi and Hatano 1998
 M. schleiferi (Yokota et al. 1993) Takeuchi and Hatano 1998
 M. sediminicola Kageyama et al. 2007
 M. sediminis Yu et al. 2013
 M. shaanxiense Peng et al. 2015
 M. soli Srinivasan et al. 2010
 M. sorbitolivorans Meng et al. 2016
 M. stercoris Zhang et al. 2021
 M. suaedae Zhu et al. 2019
 M. sulfonylureivorans Ma et al. 2022
 M. suwonense Anandham et al. 2012
 M. telephonicum Rahi et al. 2018
 M. terrae (Yokota et al. 1993) Takeuchi and Hatano 1998
 M. terregens (Lochhead and Burton 1953) Takeuchi and Hatano 1998
 M. terricola corrig. Kageyama et al. 2007

 M. testaceum (Komagata and Iizuka 1964) Takeuchi and Hatano 1998
 M. thalassium Takeuchi and Hatano 1998

 "M. timonense" Ndiaye et al. 2019
 M. trichothecenolyticum Yokota et al. 1993) Takeuchi and Hatano 1998
 M. tumbae Nishijima et al. 2017
 M. ulmi Rivas et al. 2004
 M. ureisolvens Cheng et al. 2019
 M. wangchenii Dong et al. 2020
 M. xylanilyticum Kim et al. 2005
 M. yannicii Karojet et al. 2012
 M. zeae Gao et al. 2017

References

Microbacteriaceae
Bacteria genera